The Bad Child's Book of Beasts is an 1896 children's book written by Hilaire Belloc. Illustrated by Basil Temple Blackwood, the superficially naive verses give tongue-in-cheek advice to children. In the book, the animals tend to be sage-like, and the humans dull and self-satisfied. Within the first three months of its publication, The Bad Child's Book of Beasts sold 4,000 copies.

Lord Alfred Douglas accused Belloc of plagiarizing his work Tales with a Twist, which, although published two years after The Bad Child's Book of Beasts, was, according to Douglas, written before Belloc's work.

The illustrations have also drawn comparison to the works seen in Dr. Seuss books.The Dodo

The Dodo used to walk around,

And take the sun and air.

The sun yet warms his native ground –

The Dodo is not there!

The voice which used to squawk and squeak

Is now for ever dumb –

Yet may you see his bones and beak

All in the Mu-se-um.

References

External links

1896 children's books
1896 poetry books
Children's poetry books
English-language books
English poetry collections
British children's books
Books by Hilaire Belloc
Books involved in plagiarism controversies
Bestiaries